Stomopteryx plurivittella is a moth of the family Gelechiidae. It was described by Turati in 1930. It is found in Libya.

References

Moths described in 1930
Stomopteryx